Flesh and Wood is the seventh album by Australian rock singer Jimmy Barnes, which was issued in December 1993. It was recorded by Barnes and Don Gehman co-producing and used only acoustic instruments. On eight of its fifteen tracks, Barnes duets with various artists: Diesel, Archie Roach, Joe Cocker, Ross Wilson, Tommy Emmanuel, Don Walker, Deborah Conway, and the Badloves. It reached No. 2 on the ARIA Albums Chart.

Background

In 1993 Jimmy Barnes gathered a few colleagues and performed an acoustic show in the studios of Channel 7 in Sydney to support the release of his Flesh and Wood album. The show featured a number of new songs along with a selection of Barnes' (and his former band, Cold Chisel's) tracks. It was released on VHS in 1994 and on DVD in 2005.

Barnes later commented on Gehman's recording methods, "He wouldn't use any real drumkits. Every day we would put together various bits and pieces from the kitchen and hit them in front of microphones. Pots, pans, you name it, we hit it. Cardboard boxes instead of bass drums, jars filled with rice and used as shakers."

Reviews

Jonathan Lewis from AllMusic rated it as four-out-of-five stars and explained, "Flesh and Wood was Barnes' attempt at an unplugged album, and featured duets with other Australian rock luminaries. While it contains some of Barnes' own material and some covers (including Cold Chisel's superb 'Flame Trees'), few songs here manage to match the originals; fewer still eclipse them. A competent album that shows a more sophisticated side to Barnes that was hinted at with Soul Deep."

Track listing

 "It Will Be Alright"
 "The Weight" (with the Badloves)
 "Ride the Night Away" (Steve Jordan, Steven Van Zandt)
 "Guilty" (with Joe Cocker)
 "You Can't Make Love Without a Soul"
 "Hell of a Time" (with Ross Wilson)
 "Brother of Mine" (with Tommy Emmanuel)
 "Fade to Black"
 "Flame Trees"
 "Still Got a Long Way to Go" (with Diesel)
 "Still on Your Side"
 "Stone Cold" (with Don Walker)
 "Let It Go" (with Deborah Conway)
 "We Could Be Gone" (with Archie Roach)
 "Love Me Tender"

Chart positions

Weekly Charts

Year-end charts

Certifications

Personnel
 Jimmy Barnes – vocals, acoustic guitar, percussion
 James Law – keyboards, vocals, djembe, bodhran, Jews harp, mellotron, bush harmonica
 Tony Brock – drums, percussion
 Jeff Neill – acoustic guitar, bass, bass drum
 Michael Hegerty – bass
 John Shenale – piano
 The Badloves – Michael Spiby (vocals, acoustic guitar), John Housden (acoustic guitar), Stephen O'Prey (bass), Tony Featherstone (piano), Chris Tabone (percussion)), track 2 
 Diesel –  acoustic guitar and vocals, track 10
 Joe Cocker – vocals, track 4
 Ross Wilson – vocals, track 6
 Tommy Emmanuel – acoustic guitar, track 7
 Don Walker – piano, track 12
 Deborah Conway – vocals, track 13
 Archie Roach – vocals, track 14
 Lawrie Minson – dobro, slide guitar, acoustic guitar, harmonica
 Sunil de Silva – percussion
 Marcus Holden – violin
 Michelle Kelly – violin
 Angela Lindsay – viola
 Margaret Lindsay – cello
 Pixie Jenkins – fiddle
 Gary Steele – accordion
 James Ross – viola
 Ezra Kliger – violin
 Nancy Roth – violin
 Nancy Stein-Ross – cello
 Matt Branton – bass
 Roy Martin – drums
 Guy Davies – vibes
 Allan Dargin – yidaki
 Wendy Fraser, Portia Griffin, Jessica Williams – backing vocals

2015 Tour

During Barnes' 30:30 Hindsight tour in 2014, Barnes performed a number of songs from Flesh and Wood, inspiring a 2015 national tour of its own. "The band and I are looking forward to playing all these great songs again, with a bit of storytelling and strings thrown in, when we take the show around the country in July”, said Barnes.

Set list

This is the set list from Brisbane, on 3 July 2015:
 "Is My Living in Vain"
 "Wade in the Water"
 "Stupid Heart" (from Rage and Ruin, 2010)
 "Fade to Black" (from Flesh and Wood, 1993)
 "Guilty" (from Flesh and Wood, 1993)
 "Hell of a Time" (from Flesh and Wood, 1993)
 "You Can’t Make Love Without a Soul (from Flesh and Wood, 1993)
 "Better off Alone" (from Out of the Blue, 2007)
 "Stone Cold" (from Flesh and Wood, 1993)
 "My Baby just Cares for Me" (from The Rhythm and the Blues, 2009)
 "Around the World"
 "Ride the Night Away" (from Flesh and Wood, 1993)
 "Flame Trees" (from Flesh and Wood, 1993)
 "It Will Be Alright" (from Flesh and Wood, 1993)
 "Brother of Mine" (from Flesh and Wood, 1993)
 "Still Got a Long Way to Go" (from Flesh and Wood, 1993)
 "Over the Rainbow" (Judy Garland cover)
 "Missing a Girl (from Cold Chisel, No Plans, 2012)
 "Let It Go" (from Flesh and Wood, 1993)
 "By the Grace of God" (from Love and Fear, 1999)
 "Largs Pier Hotel" (from Rage and Ruin, 2010)
 "The Weight" (from Flesh and Wood, 1993)
 "We Could Be Gone" (from Flesh and Wood, 1993)
 "Working Class Man" (from For the Working Class Man, 1985)
 "Blue Hotel" (from Out of the Blue, 2007)
 "Four Walls" (from Cold Chisel, East, 1980)
 "Catch Your Shadow" (from Heat, 1993)
 "Still on Your Side" (from Flesh and Wood, 1993)
 "I Put a Spell on You" (Screaming Jay Hawkins cover)
 "When the War Is Over" (from Cold Chisel, Circus Animals, 1982)
 "Resurrection Shuffle" (Ashton Gardner & Dyke cover)
 "Khe Sanh" (from Cold Chisel, Cold Chisel, 1978)
 "Love Me Tender" (from Flesh and Wood, 1993)

References

Jimmy Barnes albums
1993 albums
Albums produced by Don Gehman
Mushroom Records albums